The Cat Protection Society of NSW is a not for profit charity operating in Newtown, NSW. The Society was created in 1958 as a means of reducing the street cat population through neutering and adoption. Their raison d'être is "that every cat has a loving and responsible home". The current CEO is Ms Kristina Vesk OAM.

References

External links 
 

Domestic cat welfare organizations